Sclerophrys latifrons is a species of toad in the family Bufonidae.
It is found in Cameroon, Republic of the Congo, Democratic Republic of the Congo, Equatorial Guinea, Gabon, possibly Angola, and possibly Nigeria.
Its natural habitats are subtropical or tropical moist lowland forests and subtropical or tropical moist montane forests.
It is threatened by habitat loss.

References

latifrons
Amphibians described in 1900
Taxonomy articles created by Polbot